Daniel Lawrence O'Keefe (February 25, 1928 – August 29, 2012) was an American writer. He was an editor at Reader's Digest for more than 30 years, where he worked with a wide range of writers. 

He is known for creating Festivus, an annual secular holiday celebrated on December 23; it became more widely known after his eldest son, Dan O'Keefe, featured it in a December 1997 episode of the sitcom Seinfeld.

Early life and education
Born in Jersey City, New Jersey, O'Keefe received a B.A. from Columbia in 1949, an M.A. from Columbia University, and a PhD. from the New School for Social Research. At Columbia, he was national president of Junior Achievement. 

He was personally recruited for work by DeWitt Wallace, founder of Reader's Digest. O'Keefe became an editor there, serving for over thirty years. He worked with freelancers such as Ray Bradbury and Nobel Prize-winning Polish poet Czeslaw Milosz, who lived and worked for decades in California.

Writing
O'Keefe published the book Stolen Lightning: The Social Theory of Magic in 1982. A Los Angeles Times book review called this book "a spectacular synthesis of sociology, anthropology, and psychoanalysis... a tour de force of accessible scholarship". The New York Times Book Review said it is "a powerful explication of how deeply magic is embedded in society." Commonweal classified it as "a potential classic".

Festivus

O'Keefe founded Festivus in 1966 to commemorate his first date with his wife Deborah, three years earlier. Later their son Dan O'Keefe became a writer and worked on the Seinfeld television series. During the 1997–1998 season, he introduced Festivus to the rest of us in a Seinfeld episode named "The Strike".

Personal life
Daniel and Deborah O'Keefe married in 1963. She is a writer, publishing numerous magazine articles, as well as the books Good Girl Messages and Readers in Wonderland, works of literary criticism. The couple had three sons, each of whom became a writer and or composer/lyricist: Dan O'Keefe, Laurence O'Keefe, and Mark O'Keefe.

 Dan is a television writer. In addition to Seinfeld, he has written for Silicon Valley, The Drew Carey Show, The League, Veep, and other shows. In 2005, he published a book, The Real Festivus.
 Laurence is a composer, lyricist, and book-writer of musicals, including Batboy and Heathers. He collaborated on the Broadway show Legally Blonde with his wife, Nell Benjamin.
 Mark (aka Markham) has written for television, specifically the David Letterman and Bill Maher series, and for sitcoms including Newsradio and a show he created, The O'Keefes. He also collaborated with Steven Koren on screenplays for Bruce Almighty and Click.

References

External links
Daniel O'Keefe's sons
Dan O'Keefe profile, Internet Movie Database website
Laurence O'Keefe profile, Internet Movie Database website
Mark O'Keefe profile, Internet Movie Database website

1928 births
2012 deaths
Writers from Jersey City, New Jersey
The New School alumni
Columbia University alumni
American male writers